HD 206610 b is an extrasolar planet orbiting the K-type star Bosona (HD 206610) approximately 633 light years away in the constellation Aquarius.

The planet HD 206610 b is named Naron. The name was selected in the NameExoWorlds campaigns by Bosnia and Herzegovina during the 100th anniversary of the IAU. Naron is one of the names given to the Neretva river in Herzegovina originating with the Celts who called it Nera Etwa which means the Flowing Divinity. The host star HD 206610 is called Bosona. Bosona is the name given to the territory of Bosnia in the 10th century.

Planetary system
HD 206610 is a planetary system which has one known planet, HD 206610 b or Naron, discovered in 2010 using the radial velocity method.

See also
 HD 4313 b
 HD 136418 b
 HD 180902 b
 HD 181342 b
 HD 212771 b

References

External links
 

Exoplanets discovered in 2009
Exoplanets detected by radial velocity
Aquarius (constellation)
Giant planets
Exoplanets with proper names